The 2022 Virginia Cavaliers football team represented the University of Virginia as a member of the Coastal Division of the  Atlantic Coast Conference (ACC) during the 2022 NCAA Division I FBS football season. Led by first-year head coach Tony Elliott, the Cavaliers compiled an overall record of 3–7 with a mark of 1–6 in conference play, tying for sixth place in the ACC Coast Division. Virginia played home games at Scott Stadium in  Charlottesville, Virginia.
 
On the evening of November 13, wide receivers Lavel Davis Jr., Devin Chandler, and linebacker D'Sean Perry were killed while running back Mike Hollins was wounded in a shooting on the university's campus. The shooter was Christopher Darnell Jones Jr., a former running back for the Cavaliers in 2018. In its aftermath, the school announced it would cancel its final home game against Coastal Carolina on November 19 and its final game against Virginia Tech on November 26.

Schedule

Game summaries

No. 24 (FCS) Richmond

at Illinois

Old Dominion

at Syracuse

at Duke

Louisville

at Georgia Tech

Miami

No. 17 North Carolina

Pittsburgh

Coastal Carolina (Canceled)

at Virginia Tech (Canceled)

Coaching staff

Notes
The game between Coastal Carolina and Virginia was cancelled on November 16, 2022, following the 2022 University of Virginia shooting.

References

Virginia
Virginia Cavaliers football seasons
Virginia Cavaliers football team